The New Hope Valley Railway is a heritage railroad in Bonsal, North Carolina operated by the North Carolina Railway Museum, Inc., an all-volunteer, nonprofit, and tax exempt educational and historical organization.

The railroad consists of a total of 5 miles of track between the communities of Bonsal, North Carolina and New Hill, North Carolina.

The North Carolina Railway Museum, located in Bonsal, North Carolina, features a collection of antique train cars, artifacts and historic train memorabilia, and a G-scale model railroad layout and club.

Excursion trains

The railroad operates passenger excursion trains each month from April to December. Special trains are operated for Halloween on the evening of the last three Saturdays in October. They have many other themed train excursions throughout the year.

Operate-a-Loco
The New Hope Valley Railway has many different special activities that people can participate in. One of them is their Operate-a-Loco program. On select Saturdays and Sundays, anybody who wishes to (must be over age 18 and have a valid drivers license) may come and drive one of their diesel locomotives. You are guided along their 4 miles of track (8 mile round trip) under the supervision of one of their trained engineers. All equipment and other items are provided by the railway.

Organization
The railroad is operated by an all-volunteer crew, and it is a member of the HeritageRail Alliance and the East Carolina Chapter of the National Railway Historical Society (NRHS).

Collection
The North Carolina Railway Museum also displays a collection of historic railroad equipment used in North Carolina at the railroad's Bonsal terminal.  This is a primarily outdoor exhibit, and is open to the public on ride days throughout the year. For more information, goto www.triangletrain.com.

Locomotives
 5 - General Electric diesel locomotives, obtained from the United States Army, United States Navy and United States Marine Corps
 1 - Whitcomb diesel locomotive
 1 - Baldwin-Lima-Hamilton diesel locomotive
 1 - ALCO S1 diesel locomotive
 1 - A 0-4-0T steam locomotive built by Vulcan Iron Works in 1941 for New York Shipbuilding of Camden, New Jersey, taken out of service in early 2017 for the FRA 1472 day inspection. Engineering work on 17's boiler was completed in 2019. A new smokebox was ordered in late 2019 and completed in January 2020; delivery to Bonsal is expected in February 2020.
 1 - A 2-6-2 Prairie Type Steam locomotive built by Vulcan Iron Works in 1927 for the McRae Lumber & Manufacturing Company.  Sold to the Cliffside Railroad in 1933 and renumbered 110, and was the last steam locomotive to operate on the road before it dieselized in 1962.  The 110 was eventually sold to the Stone Mountain Scenic Railroad, a tourist railroad that operates around the perimeter of Stone Mountain Park in Stone Mountain, Georgia.  The 110 operated here until 1982, when it encountered running gear issues.  The railroad's owner, the Stone Mountain Memorial Association, then placed it on display. The Stone Mountain Memorial Association donated the engine to the New Hope Valley Railway in Bonsal, North Carolina in 2012, and the engine was moved to the railway in early February 2013. The New Hope Valley intends to restore the engine to operating condition, which is anticipated to take five to seven years at an estimated cost of $600,000 based on an initial survey of the engine performed in 2012. Work on the 110 is on hold pending the 1472 of engine 17.

Rolling stock
Seaboard Air Line Railroad #01190: Steel M-8 Caboose
Seaboard Air Line Railroad #5228: Wooden Caboose
Aberdeen and Rockfish Railroad #308: Wooden Caboose
Norfolk Southern Railroad #335: Wooden Caboose built in 1913 for the original NS. (Last surviving Norfolk Southern wooden caboose)
Norfolk Southern Railroad #711 Crane boom tender and camp car
Southern Railway Combine baggage car and Railway Post Office #188
Atlantic Coast Line Railroad Baggage Car #1665 (not currently on public display)
US Marine Corps flatcars converted to open excursion cars for passengers (4)
US Marine Corps flatcars (2)
Chesapeake & Ohio Railroad #23044 insulated cushion-underframe boxcar (not currently on public display)
US Army Transportation Corps Kitchen Car #87109 (houses museum gift shop and exhibits)
Swifts Premium Refrigerator car (Reefer)
Southern Railway boxcars (2)
Southern Railway #958060 Pullman low side gondola
Pullman Company former 12-1 tourist sleeper Calais (not currently on public display)
Norfolk Southern Railroad #910 camp car (not currently on public display)
Boston & Maine Railroad RDC9 #6929 trailer passenger car (previously on lease to the Red Springs & Northern Foundation in Parkton, North Carolina) ***Note:  This car was moved back to Bonsal on April 17, 2014.
 Various other examples of railroad and construction equipment

History
The railroad line operated as the New Hope Valley Railway was originally constructed as the Durham & South Carolina Railroad (D&SC) in 1905-1906 to tap the timber resources of the valley of New Hope Creek, and served the communities of Bonsal, North Carolina where it had a junction with the Seaboard Air Line Railroad (now part of CSX), Beaver Creek, North Carolina, Seaforth, North Carolina, Farrington, North Carolina, Blands, North Carolina, Penny, North Carolina, and Durham, North Carolina.

The line was extended south between 1911 and 1913 from Bonsal, North Carolina to Duncan, North Carolina where it joined the Norfolk Southern Railroad.  The D&SC line was leased by the Norfolk Southern Railroad in 1920 to provide the larger railroad with access to the City of Durham, North Carolina.  In 1925 a spur was built at Durham, North Carolina to serve the new plant of the American Tobacco Company in that city.  The line was rebuilt on a new alignment in the 1970s by the US Army Corps of Engineers when the B. Everett Jordan Dam was constructed, impounding the valley of New Hope Creek to form Jordan Lake.  The line eventually became (briefly) part of the Southern Railway, and a 6-mile section was sold to the East Carolina Chapter, NRHS in 1983.  This organization was subsequently renamed the North Carolina Railway Museum, Inc. early in 2008.

The northern portion of the original railroad, from the community of New Hill, North Carolina north to Durham, North Carolina has been converted into the American Tobacco Trail.  To the south, the railroad is part of the Shearon Harris nuclear power plant and its surrounding land.

References

External links

 New Hope Valley Railway
 National Railway Historical Society
 HeritageRail Alliance

Heritage railroads in North Carolina
Railroad museums in North Carolina
Museums in Wake County, North Carolina
Transportation in Wake County, North Carolina